Andrés Leonardo Márquez Goytiño (born 3 September 1984 in Sarandí del Yí) is a Uruguayan football forward who currently plays for Plaza Colonia in the Uruguayan Primera División.

Club career
Márquez started his football career at Nacional in 2005.

He transferred to China League One side Hebei Zhongji on 27 January 2014.

Notes

References

External links

1984 births
Living people
People from Durazno Department
Uruguayan footballers
Association football forwards
Club Nacional de Football players
C.A. Bella Vista players
Centro Atlético Fénix players
C.A. Cerro players
Club Atlético River Plate (Montevideo) players
Rampla Juniors players
Hebei F.C. players
China League One players
Uruguayan expatriate footballers
Expatriate footballers in Guatemala
Expatriate footballers in China
Uruguayan expatriate sportspeople in China